Akharım is a town (belde) and municipality in the Sandıklı District, Afyonkarahisar Province, Turkey. Its population is 2,688 (2021).

References

Populated places in Afyonkarahisar Province
Towns in Turkey
Sandıklı District